Hess's was a department store chain based in Allentown, Pennsylvania. The company started in 1897 with one store, originally known as Hess Brothers, and grew to nearly 80 stores by its peak in the late 1980s. The chain's stores were closed or sold off in a series of deals in the early to mid-1990s.

History

Establishment

Hess Brothers was founded on February 19, 1897, by Charles and Max Hess. During the summer of 1896, Max Hess Sr., a German-Jewish immigrant from Perth Amboy, New Jersey, visited Allentown. He returned to Perth Amboy and told his brother Charles, that Allentown was a major business opportunity. The brothers moved to Allentown in 1897 and leased space inside the Grand Central Hotel. On February 19, 1897, the Allentown Band was playing in front of the new Hess Brothers store to entertain the shoppers. Hess also bought a significant amount of advertising space in the local Allentown newspapers to inform people about his store. The Hess Brother's dry goods business became more and more successful and in 1901, the Hess store expanded to take over the entire Grand Central Hotel.

In Hess's French Room, Charles Hess filled the store with fashions primarily from France. Charles Hess made frequent trips to Paris, and in Allentown newspaper articles, he wrote what the fashionable woman in the French capitol were wearing for social engagements or to the Paris Opera.

On 6 March 1913, the store was expanded by acquiring neighboring properties and adding a soda fountain and restaurant that seated 400 patrons, filling almost a city block. By 1915, the store had expanded to nearly a city block and dominated the northeast corner of Ninth and Hamilton. In 1922, Max Sr. died at the age of 58 and for the next several years the store was run by his brother Charles. In 1927, an eight-story annex was added to the store that containing new departments that also added a shipping and delivery area.

Golden era
Charles Hess died in 1929. as Max Hess Jr. was beginning studies at Muhlenberg College. On his 21st birthday, Max left Muhlenberg to join the family business as part of the management team. Three years later, he became president.

In the 1953 B.C. Forbes & Sons book, America’s Twelve Master Salesmen, Hess is listed as the second master salesman. Celebrities were brought in on a regular basis to attract customers and enhance the image of the store. As people dined in the restaurants, models would walk the floor wearing the latest fashions. The restaurant lost close to $20,000 a year but it was a success in achieving its primary purpose of keeping customers in the store.

While the exterior of the store still appeared as separate buildings, the inside was renovated to look as one large building. Displays such as large crystal chandeliers enabled the Hess brothers to succeed at making their store look like a "big city department store." By 1939, they began renovations of the outside of the store. The facade of the store was updated in 1947 using the Art Moderne style. It was also the first store in the world to have automatic talking elevators, telling its passengers what items were available on each floor.

One of the landmarks of Allentown was the large Hess Brothers sign on the store's corner at 9th and Hamilton Street. The  sign was the biggest of its type outside New York City, weighing 8 tons. The sign was three-sided to make it visible to both eastbound and westbound traffic. The 378 circuits were operated by a clock inside the sign that had eight light cycles timed to spell the name H E S S one letter at a time. The sign was turned on for the first time on 23 December 1947. On June 30, 1972, it was removed along with all the other outdoor retail signage in the Central Business District.

With offices in London, Paris, and Rome, Hess Brothers Department Store was always at the forefront in selling the latest fashions. Children delighted at the giant toy soldiers Hess's used as Christmas decorations in addition to "Pip the Mouse" in a puppet show at the flagship store. The annual May flower show was another innovative attraction for a department store and a flower show special aired on Philadelphia television annually. Other television shows that became annual events were the imported fashions show and the toy show. Hess brought celebrities to appear at the store, including by Johnny Carson, Zsa Zsa Gabor, Barbara Walters, Rosalynn Carter, Burt Ward (Robin in the Batman television series), Gina Lollobrigida and Rock Hudson.

Significant in its retail firsts was the over-the-counter sale of pure gold in 1974 when bullion sale was legalized, as well as the introduction of the Rudi Gernreich topless bathing suit (Hess's was one of only a handful of stores in the entire country to carry the suits, notably failing to sell a single one). Biannual sales events at Hess's were often semi-disastrous as shoppers who waited outside for the store to open in the morning would proceed to trample each other and store employees to get to discounted merchandise, leaving the shelves and racks completely stripped bare afterwards.

In 1968, Hess contacted Philip Berman, who had operated a local trucking business for many years with his brother and offered to sell the store.  After some negotiations, Berman paid Hess $16 million. Several months later Hess died at the age of 57, never being able to enjoy a retirement. Under Philip Berman, the store name was officially changed from Hess Brothers to Hess's. Berman also brought in Max Rosey, a New York City and Broadway press agent to promote the store.  Rosey and Berman worked hard to keep the Hess name in both the local and also national media.  They brought in celebrities and notable national politicians to visit the store and promote Hess's nationally.  Also Berman began to expand the store, opening new stores in suburban Pennsylvania shopping malls. Berman noted the success of the new Whitehall Mall, with the Allentown Sears and Zollinger and Harned department stores in suburban Allentown. He wanted Hess's to be part of the wave of mall construction during the 1970s, and to be anchor stores in them. Additional stores were established in Lancaster and Easton in 1971; Bethlehem in 1973, two in suburban Allentown shopping centers in 1974, and others in eastern and central Pennsylvania by 1979.

Chain operations
In October 1979, Crown American, a developer and owner of hotels and shopping malls, purchased the Hess's chain, then 17 stores large, as a wholly owned subsidiary. Under Crown American's leadership, Hess's enjoyed the booming retail market of the 1980s and expanded to 76 stores by 1990. However, a number of cost-cutting measures had been made following the transfer of the chain to Berman and Crown American, including abandoning most of Hess's previous practices such as the flower/fashion shows and celebrity appearances. The store's outside windows in the main Allentown store were covered up after their annual holiday window decoration displays were ended, along with the regular store window dressing displays of merchandise.

In addition to opening stores in available locations, Hess's purchased other department store chains and converted them to the Hess's nameplate, such as Penn Traffic Department Stores, based in Johnstown, Pennsylvania, in 1982 (bringing Hess's to locations such as State College and Johnstown), and Rices Nachmans, based in Virginia Beach, Virginia, in 1985. Hess's also acquired the Knoxville, Tennessee based Miller's Department Store chain from Allied Stores by Hostile takeover in 1987. In September 1987 Hess's agreed to acquire Snyder's, Inc., a privately held Louisville, Kentucky, department store, as well as five L. S. Ayres stores in Kentucky that Snyder's had agreed to buy (L. S. Ayres having assumed them from Stewart Dry Goods and Pogue's only a few years earlier). This new division was briefly operated under the Snyder's name, but in November 1987 Hess's announced that it would phase out the Millers and Snyder's names in favor of its own moniker in February 1988.

In a few years, however, Hess's suffered under increased retail competition and a national recession, so it sold or shuttered 43 of its stores, especially in the South, including the Knoxville stores to Dillard's and 18 sold to Proffitt's in two deals in 1992 and 1993. The remaining 30 stores were sold off including the main Allentown store in 1994, ending the Hess's 97-year enterprise; May Department Stores purchased 10 locations, and The Bon-Ton bought 20.

Store closure and redevelopment in Allentown, Pennsylvania
In 1995 Crown American sold the Downtown Allentown store to Bon-Ton Stores, Inc., a regional department store company based in York, Pennsylvania. However, Allentown had been declining for years starting in the 1970s and continued operation was not profitable. On November 9, 1995, Bon-Ton Stores announced that the Downtown Allentown store was closing, and permanently closed on January 15, 1996.

With the closure of the store, Bon-Ton placed the property for sale and received inquiries from Mark Mendleson. However, Mendleson had a poor reputation with property management, and he was involved in a series of disputes with the City of Allentown with regards to non-payment of taxes, and the properties he owned being in an extremely poor state of repair. It was also feared by the City that the property would be left vacant until property values improved, or it would be used for a large flea market, tattoo parlors or adult movie theaters.

Allentown Mayor William L. Heydt began a campaign for the City to purchase the property and redevelop the building. In October 1998, the city purchased the store from Bon-Ton, Inc. for $1.8 million. In addition to the department store building, the adjacent closed H.L. Green property, which was operated for decades as part of the McCrory Stores five and ten store chain, was purchased. However, with the purchase by the City, a survey of the property revealed that the 9th and Hamilton Street building was in relatively poor condition and considered unsuitable for any other use. The site was considered not worth preserving, and plans were made for its demolition. The seven-story parking deck at 814 Linden Street and the employee parking deck at 826 Turner Street, built in 1970, were retained and transferred to the Allentown Parking Authority.

A considerable remediation effort was begun to rid the old building of hazardous materials. In January 2000, the Pennsylvania Department of Environmental Protection gave its go-ahead for demolition work to commence. The demolition was completed by October 2000 and the site was graded with gravel, and a fence erected.

During this time, a series of redevelopment options, including the building of a hockey arena, was reviewed by the City. Eventually the former Hess's property was sold to PPL Corporation, which expanded its office complex onto the site with the Plaza at PPL Center, a new office building that opened in July 2003 at the former Hess's flagship store site. The building includes one floor of leased office space, and the plaza level of the building includes retail storefronts.

In popular culture
James A. Michener mentions Hess's flagship Allentown store in his 1991 novel The Novel'', as the location where a fictional author sells his novels' first printings.

See also

 H. Leh and Company
 Zollinger and Harned
 List of historic places in Allentown, Pennsylvania

References

Defunct department stores based in Pennsylvania
Retail companies established in 1897
Companies based in Allentown, Pennsylvania
Retail companies disestablished in 1994
Defunct companies based in Pennsylvania
History of Allentown, Pennsylvania
Buildings and structures in Lehigh County, Pennsylvania
Buildings and structures in Allentown, Pennsylvania
1897 establishments in Pennsylvania
1994 disestablishments in Pennsylvania